Kellie Wells-Brinkley (born July 16, 1982) is an American track and field athlete who specialises in the 100 metres hurdles. She won an Olympic bronze medal at the London 2012, setting a personal best in the process. She is an alumna of Hampton University.

Personal

As a high school sophomore at James River High School in Chesterfield Virginia she left home after her mother's fiancé raped her. Her mother and stepfather were killed in a car accident a month later.

In December 2015 Kellie Wells and husband New York Giants Linebacker Jasper Brinkley gave birth to Jasper Brinkley Jr.   Wells appeared on Say Yes to the Dress TV show choosing her wedding dress for wedding to Jasper Brinkley

She is the aunt of former child actor Brandon Ratcliff

Wells and LaVonne Idlette appeared on The Amazing Race 32 and placed tenth. As revealed in the series, Wells is diagnosed with dyslexia.

Achievements
2011 US National 100 metres Hurdles Champion  ( 2nd in 2010, 2012 )

Note: In the 2011 World Championship final, Wells fell after hitting the seventh hurdle and failed to finish.

References

External links

1982 births
Living people
American female hurdlers
Athletes (track and field) at the 2012 Summer Olympics
Olympic bronze medalists for the United States in track and field
Medalists at the 2012 Summer Olympics
USA Outdoor Track and Field Championships winners
USA Indoor Track and Field Championships winners
The Amazing Race (American TV series) contestants
Sportspeople with dyslexia
20th-century American women
21st-century American women